Jonathan W. Rinzler (August 17, 1962July 28, 2021) was a film historian and writer, known for publishing books about the behind the scenes of blockbuster movies such as Star Wars and Indiana Jones. Rinzler also wrote the novel Indiana Jones and the Mystery of Mount Sinai, as well as All Up, about the Space Race.

Career 
After living in France for almost ten years, Jonathan Rinzler returned to the United States looking to work in the movie industry, more specifically with LucasFilm. Rinzler, who had been working as a managing editor until that point, was interviewed for a position in the company to work with non-fiction books. He then joined the company in 2001, as the executive editor of LucasBooks, the company's publishing arm.

At the time, the company was producing Episode II: Attack of the Clones, and Rinzler had been hired to produce a series of books about the making of their movies. Rinzler met with Rick McCallum and they talked about how the books should be "about the whole production" instead of focusing only on the special effects. After producing a book on all movies of the trilogy, Rinzler maintained contact with LucasFilm and was commissioned to produce a making-of Indiana Jones in 2008. Despite having left the company in 2016, Rinzler still produced a book about the behind the scenes of the 1968 film Planet of the Apes for Disney in 2018.

In a 2019 interview to The Verge, Rinzler explained his love for making of books came about after watching the Jaws (1975) and acquiring The Jaws Log as well as Industrial Light & Magic: The Art of Special Effects.

In 2019, Rinzler published The Making of Alien, a behind-the-scenes book about the making of the 1979 film Alien with cast and crew interviews and previously-unseen photographs.  This was followed by The Making of Aliens, a behind-the-scenes book about the making of the 1986 film Aliens in 2020.

Rinzler also published a novel in 2020 called All Up, about the Space Race between the United States and Soviet Russia. He spent one year researching for the book, and about seven years writing it sporadically, until its publication.

Death 
In November 2020, Rinzler's wife announced that he had been diagnosed with pancreatic cancer in August. On August 4, 2021, his death was announced by his daughter, through Rinzler's Twitter account, saying he had died on July 28. His last two books Howard Kazanjian: A Producer's Life and Stanley Kubrick’s The Shining were published posthumously in September 2021 and February 2023.

Selected works 
Non-fiction books
 
 
 
 
 
 
 
 
 

Fiction books

References 

1962 births
2021 deaths
21st-century American non-fiction writers
Deaths from cancer in the United States
Deaths from pancreatic cancer
Lucasfilm people
American film historians
American expatriates in France